The Featherweight competition was the fourth-lowest weight featured  at the 2009 World Amateur Boxing Championships, and was held at the Mediolanum Forum. Featherweights were limited to a maximum of 57 kilograms in body mass.

Medalists

Seeds

  Vasyl Lomachenko (champion)
  Bahodirjon Sooltonov (semifinals)
  Luis Enrique Porozo (third round)
  Oscar Valdez  (semifinals)
  Li Yang  (second round)
  Satoshi Shimizu  (first round)
  Akhil Kumar  (first round)
  Sergey Vodopyanov (final)

Draw

Finals

Top Half

Section 1

Section 2

Bottom Half

Section 3

Section 4

See also
Boxing at the 2008 Summer Olympics – Featherweight

External links
Draw

Featherweight